Theodore "Ted" Solotaroff (October 9, 1928 – August 8, 2008) was an American writer, editor and literary critic.

Life and career
Born into a working-class Jewish family in Elizabeth, New Jersey, Solotaroff attended the University of Michigan, graduating in 1952, and did graduate work at the University of Chicago, where he became friends with Philip Roth and dedicated himself to literature. He was an editor at Commentary from 1960 to 1966, then in 1967 founded The New American Review, which was an influential literary journal in paperback, not magazine, format for the decade of its existence. After it folded, he became an editor at Harper & Row, where he edited works by Russell Banks, Sue Miller, Robert Bly, Bobbie Ann Mason, and others. "In 1989, when Rupert Murdoch bought Harper & Row, Solotaroff began to do less editing and more writing. He left the book business with a parting shot at what he labeled 'the literary-industrial complex.'"

He said of the effect of the 1960s on him and his work:[T]he market for serious writing cracked open in the Sixties and soon became a kind of howling forum where all manners of ideas, styles and standards contended for attention. As the literary climate altered radically, there was a distinct shift among writers and editors from a preoccupation with values as the ground of experience to a preoccupation with experience as the ground of values—a shift that was, of course, to be felt everywhere in America as the decade of opposition and revision careened along. For those, like myself, who entered the Sixties wedded to their values, the more or less standard ones of academic liberalism and humanism, but quite out of touch with their own experience, this breaking of the ice was alternately exhilarating and dismaying: one felt  stirred but also swamped.

Death
He died at his home in East Quogue, New York from complications from pneumonia, aged 79. He was survived by his fourth wife (of 28 years), Virginia Heiserman Solotaroff, as well as four sons, and his brother, Robert.

Awards
1999 PEN/Martha Albrand Award for the Art of the Memoir for Truth Comes in Blows

Bibliography

References

Further reading
 Solotaroff, Ted (1950). "Evening Song". Generation. pp. 16–27 
 Winfrey, Lee (April 11, 1971). "If It's That Controversial, Send It to Ted Solotaroff". Detroit Free Press. p. 19
 Hentoff, Margot (August 16, 1971). "New American Review". New York. p. 56
 Weisman, John (March 18, 1973). "Would-Be Hemingways Need Not Apply". Detroit Free Press. p. 45
 Harris, McDonald (December 13, 1987). "Ted Solotaroff: An Editor at Work". The Washington Post. pp. 10–11
 Margolick, Dan (November 15, 1998). "Review: 'Truth Comes in Blows: A Memoir'". The New York Times. p. BR18
 Cryer, Dan (December 13, 1998). "Talking with Ted Solotaroff". Newsday. p. 11

External links
Ted Solotaroff interview with Stephen Banker (1972) on YouTube

American essayists
Jewish American writers
American literary critics
University of Michigan alumni
Deaths from pneumonia in New York (state)
Writers from Elizabeth, New Jersey
People from East Quogue, New York
Writers from New York (state)
1928 births
2008 deaths
20th-century essayists
20th-century American Jews
21st-century American Jews